Afternoon of the Bulls is a 1956 Spanish drama film directed by Ladislao Vajda. It was entered into the 1956 Cannes Film Festival. The film was selected as the Spanish entry for the Best Foreign Language Film at the 29th Academy Awards.

Plot

In the bullring of Las Ventas,  in Madrid, four parallel stories are shown in the film: the senior bullfighter Ricardo Puente breaks up with his lover Paloma; the winner of the day, Juan Carmona is barely hurt by a bull because he is haunted with the notice of a new baby; Rondeño II is afraid of the bulls and afraid of the wedding with his girlfriend Ana María; finally, an innocent amateur torero dies on the sand.

Selected cast
 Manuel Arbó as Vecino de la actriz
 Rafael Bardem as Amigo 1º
 Félix Dafauce as Médico de la plaza
 José Isbert as Don Felipe
 Manolo Morán as Jiménez
 Antonio Prieto as Enterado 1º
 Jesús Tordesillas as Luis Montes

See also
 List of submissions to the 29th Academy Awards for Best Foreign Language Film
 List of Spanish submissions for the Academy Award for Best Foreign Language Film

References

External links

1956 films
1956 drama films
1950s Spanish-language films
Films directed by Ladislao Vajda
Spanish drama films
1950s Spanish films